D'Arsonval is a small lunar impact crater on the far side of the Moon. It is situated across the northeastern rim of the older and larger crater Danjon. To the west of D'Arsonval is Perepelkin.

The rim of D'Arsonval is somewhat worn and it has a low, elongated central ridge near the midpoint. The rim forms a saddle depression where it is joined with Danjon to the southwest. There is a cleft in the lunar surface beginning just to the east of the outer rim and running northward.

Satellite craters
By convention these features are identified on lunar maps by placing the letter on the side of the crater midpoint that is closest to D'Arsonval.

References

External links
 LTO-83C1 Danjon — L&PI topographic map

Impact craters on the Moon